Christy Jusung (born 12 December 1982) is an Indonesian film and television actress. She became widely known after playing the character Sabrina in the Ramadan television series Lorong Waktu in the early 2000s.

She started his career by playing a cameo role in the Warkop Millenium series in 1999. In addition, he also played a role in several other productions including O-Jekri, Tarzan Betawi, Perjaka and Sial-Sial Mujur.

Personal life
Christy Jusung is the daughter of George Jusung and Juniarty Zulanifah and is the second child of this couple. She married actor Hengky Kurniawan in 2008 and divorced in 2012. She later married Jay Alatas in 2013 but divorced in 2014.

Filmography

Movies 
 Lihat Boleh, Pegang Jangan (2010)

TV series 
 Lorong Waktu (2000)
 O-Jekri (2003)
 Hidayah (Eps: Berani Mempermainkan Sumpah Mati Di Tabrak Truk) (2005)
 Hidayah (Eps: Jenazah Di Ganggu B*** Hutan Saat Akan Di Kubur) (2005)
 Hidayah (Eps: Azab Tukang Ojek Menabrak Usungan Mayat) (2005)
 Taubat (Eps: Ibu Ku Seorang Pembunuh) (2005)
 Hidayah (Eps: Suami Mati, Istri Gila Akibat Berselingkuh) (2006)
 Di Atas Sajadah Cinta (2006)
 Munajah Cinta (2008)
 Inayah (2009)
 Hanya Kamu 2 (2013)

Television movies 
 Hadiah Terindah
 Awet Muda Yang Tak Berkah
 Burokonan Itu Ibuku

References

1982 births
Living people
Indonesian actresses
Indonesian film actresses
21st-century Indonesian actresses
People from Jakarta